Vanuma (Bvanuma), or South Nyali, is a minor Bantu language of the Democratic Republic of the Congo. It is lexically similar to Ndaka and Budu, Mbo, and Nyali.

References

Nyali languages
Languages of the Democratic Republic of the Congo